The 2000 United States presidential election in Oregon was held on Tuesday, November, 7, 2000 as part of the concurrent United States presidential election. Voters chose seven electors, or representatives to the Electoral College, to vote for the next president and vice president of the United States.

The state of Oregon voted for Democrat Al Gore over Republican George W. Bush by a narrow margin of 0.4 percentage points, or 6,765 votes. Oregon has been considered a blue state in recent years, voting for the Democratic Party in every presidential election since 1988. However, Gore's narrow win was relatively weak considering the state's typical partisan lean. This is the closest that Oregon has come to voting for a Republican for president since Ronald Reagan carried the state in 1984. This also marks the last election in which the margin of victory in Oregon was less than a percentage point, the last time that the Democratic Party failed to win a majority in the state, and the last time that the state would vote more Republican than the nation. Four years later John Kerry would win the state by a larger, yet somewhat modest, margin and from 2008 and onward Oregon would be considered a safely blue state on the presidential level. Almost eighty percent of registered voters came out to vote on election day, the highest in the country. 

Bush became the first Republican ever to win the White House without carrying Washington County. As of 2020, this is the last time Oregon has voted to the right of Pennsylvania or Minnesota.

Results
Official state results from the Oregon Secretary of State are as follows:

Results by county
Official county results from the Oregon Secretary of State are as follows:

Counties that flipped from Democratic to Republican
Clackamas (Largest city: Lake Oswego)
Coos (Largest city: Coos Bay)
Gilliam (Largest city: Condon)
Marion (Largest city: Salem)
Morrow (Largest city: Boardman)
Tillamook (Largest city: Tillamook)
Wasco (Largest city: The Dalles)

Results by congressional district
Bush won 3 of 5 congressional districts, including two held by Democrats.

See also
 United States presidential elections in Oregon
 Presidency of George W. Bush

References

Oregon
2000
Presidential